Sonic Boom is the nineteenth studio album, and the first in 11 years, by the rock band Kiss, released on October 6, 2009. The album was recorded at Conway Recording Studios in Hollywood, Los Angeles, CA and produced by Paul Stanley and co-produced by Greg Collins. This was the first studio album to be released with the current line-up, consisting of Paul Stanley, Gene Simmons, Tommy Thayer, and Eric Singer. It was also the first to feature lead vocal performances from Thayer and Singer. Stanley stated, "the purpose of this album isn't to let people know that we're still around – it's to let people know we can still knock out anybody who's out there!".

Album information
A fan-routed North American tour promoted the album along with international shows throughout 2010, which included the band headlining the Rock am Ring festival in Germany. The cover artwork was created by artist Michael Doret who had worked with Kiss previously to create the cover of their 1976 album Rock and Roll Over.
Wal-Mart is the exclusive distributor of the album in the US and Canada, selling it as a three disc package including the album, Kiss Klassics (a completely re-recorded greatest hits album that until now had been exclusively released in Japan as Jigoku-Retsuden), and a six-song live DVD recorded April 5, 2009, in Buenos Aires, Argentina as part of the South American leg of the Kiss Alive/35 World Tour.

The album was sold as a digipak including a 20-page booklet. The album's first single was announced on the band's official website to be "Modern Day Delilah". The album was also released on limited edition 180 gram vinyl and was pressed into five colors (red, green, black, blue and purple) with 1000 copies pressed of each. "Modern Day Delilah" was announced and released as the lead single from Sonic Boom on August 19, 2009, to radio. It was Kiss' first single release in 11 years, the last being "You Wanted the Best" released in 1998.

The music video for "Modern Day Delilah" leaked online on the first days of December and was officially released on December 9, 2009, and premiered on Yahoo!. The video is topped and tailed by footage of giant sized members of Kiss walking through Detroit. The video went on to top UK music video channel Scuzz's "Most Rockin: Viewer Request Show" chart on December 3, 2009. The single was released as downloadable content for Guitar Hero 5 and Band Hero on November 19, 2009, along with the singles "I Was Made for Lovin' You" and "Lick It Up". Modern Day Delilah peaked at #50 on the Billboard Rock songs chart. The song was used for their opening song for the Sonic Boom Over Europe Tour and The Hottest Show on Earth Tour.

"Say Yeah" was added to the shows on the Sonic Boom Tour/Alive 35 North American Tour 2009. Later on, it was mentioned during Kiss' Facebook concert broadcast that "Say Yeah" was going to be the next single off Sonic Boom. On December 5, it was announced that the single would be released to radios on December 8. The single was released on the second week of January 2010 in Argentina. "Say Yeah" also hit #1 on February 5, 2010, on a Russian Radio Chart after debuting at #11. "Never Enough" was released as the next radio single from Sonic Boom in early June 2010 and was mentioned on KISSonline.com. The song was not incorporated into the band's setlist on its 2010 Summer Tour of the US and Canada.
The song "Modern Day Delilah" was also used in 2015 for the movie Scooby-Doo! and Kiss: Rock and Roll Mystery along with the second disc's rerecorded versions of "Rock and Roll All Nite", "Shout It Out Loud", and "Detroit Rock City".

Reception

The album received generally positive reviews from critics. Sonic Boom debuted at #2 on the Billboard 200, selling 108,000 copies in its first week of release. The #2 position was the highest mark ever reached by the group, beating the #3 debut of Psycho Circus in 1998. The album finished 2009 with 238,000 units sold and finished 2010 as one of Billboard's Top 50 Rock Albums. Metal Hammer listed the album in 13th place on the list Metal Hammer Albums of 2009 list. Since its release, Sonic Boom has received Gold certification in Norway.

Track listing

Disc 2
Bonus CD Compilation (Kiss Klassics)

Disc 3
DVD – Live in Buenos Aires, Argentina (Recorded on April 5, 2009, at the River Plate Stadium)
"Deuce"
"Hotter Than Hell"
"C'mon and Love Me"
"Watchin' You"
"100,000 Years"
"Rock and Roll All Nite"

Personnel
Kiss
Paul Stanley – vocals, rhythm guitar
Gene Simmons – vocals, bass
Tommy Thayer – lead guitar, vocals
Eric Singer – drums, vocals

Additional personnel
Brian Whelan – piano

Production
Greg Collins – co-producer, engineering, mixing
Eric Weaver – engineering
Valente Torrez – engineering
Pat Woodward – engineering
Matt "Wiggy" Wiggers – engineering
Miles Wilson – additional engineering
David Donnelly – mastering
t42design – art direction, design
Michael Doret – cover illustration
Neil Zlozower – photography
Dean Snowden – photography

Charts

Weekly charts

Year-end charts

References

External links

Messages from Kiss on new album

Kiss (band) albums
2009 albums
Albums produced by Paul Stanley